The University of California, Los Angeles School of Medicine—known as the David Geffen School of Medicine at UCLA (DGSOM)—is an accredited medical school located in Los Angeles, California, United States. The school was renamed in 2001 in honor of media mogul David Geffen who donated $200 million in unrestricted funds. Founded in 1951, it is the second medical school in the University of California system, after the UCSF School of Medicine.

History

Founding
For many years, dating back to when it first affiliated with the University of California in 1873, the UCSF School of Medicine was the only public medical school in California.  This made sense in the late 19th century when most of California's population lived in Northern California and Southern California was a lightly populated desert.  It no longer made sense by the 1940s, after Los Angeles had overtaken San Francisco to become the leading metropolis on the West Coast of the United States. Dr.Elmer Belt was instrumental in lobbying for the establishment of the School.

Therefore, in 1945, the Board of Regents voted to establish a medical school at UCLA. In 1947, Stafford L. Warren was appointed as the first dean. Warren had served on the Manhattan Project while on leave from his post at University of Rochester School of Medicine. His choice of core faculty consisted of his former associates at Rochester in Andrew Dowdy as the first professor of radiology, John Lawrence as the first professor of medicine, and Charles Carpenter as the first professor of infectious diseases. Along with William Longmire Jr., a 34-year-old surgeon from Johns Hopkins, the group was called the Founding Five.

The building of the medical center and the School of Medicine began in 1949. The 1951 charter class consisted of 26 men and 2 women. Initially, there were 15 faculty members, although that number had increased to 43 by 1955 when the charter class graduated. The first classes were conducted in the reception lounge of the old Religious Conference Building on Le Conte Avenue. Clinical education was initially conducted on the wards of Harbor General Hospital, which today is Harbor-UCLA Medical Center.

In July 1955, the UCLA Medical Center was opened.

Mellinkoff administration
Sherman Mellinkoff succeeded Stafford Warren as dean in 1962 and served for the next 24 years. Under Mellinkoff, the UCLA Neuropsychiatric Institute, the UCLA Brain Research Institute, and the Marion Davies Children's Center were founded. The Jules Stein Eye Institute and the Reed Neurological Research Center were established. By decade's end, UCLA had doubled the size of the medical school and the hospital. The UCLA School of Dentistry, School of Public Health, and School of Nursing were formed as well. The medical school grew to nearly 400 medical students, more than 700 interns and residents, and almost 200 master's and doctorate candidates.

A partnership was formed with the Charles R. Drew University of Medicine and Science in 1966 to train medical students with the goal of meeting the needs of the underserved in South Los Angeles.

The school continued its growth in the 1970s, becoming affiliated with VA facilities as well as Olive View–UCLA Medical Center. In 1974, the school co-founded the Biomedical Sciences Program with UC Riverside, which offers 24 students each year the opportunity to earn both the B.S. and M.D. degrees in seven years instead of the traditional eight.

1981 saw the dedication of the Doris and Louis Factor Health Sciences Building which houses the School of Nursing and Jonsson Comprehensive Cancer Center. In 1987, construction began on UCLA Medical Plaza, an outpatient facility located across the street from the main hospital.

Post-Mellinkoff era
Kenneth I. Shine succeeded Sherman Mellinkoff as dean in 1986. In 1992 Shine left UCLA to become President of the Institute of Medicine in Washington, D.C. Gerald S. Levey was then appointed provost of medical sciences and dean of the medical school in 1994. Levey oversaw expansion of interdisciplinary research and the establishment of a Department of Human Genetics. The Gonda (Goldschmied) Neuroscience and Genetics Research Center, as well as the Ronald Reagan UCLA Medical Center, were constructed. In October 2008, Levey announced that he would be stepping down from the position of Dean in 2009.

Effective February 2010, A. Eugene Washington was appointed Dean of the UCLA School of Medicine and Vice-Chancellor of Health Sciences at UCLA. Washington, a clinician, academician, researcher, and university administrator, was recruited from UCSF, where he served as Vice-Chancellor and Provost, as well as Professor of gynecology, epidemiology, and health policy. Washington is the first African-American to hold these leadership posts at UCLA.

UCLA constructed the Ronald Reagan UCLA Medical Center across the street from the original facility to comply with the California earthquake law. The  hospital is named after the late President of the United States and Governor of California, Ronald Reagan. It was designed by architect I.M. Pei. Patients were transferred there from the existing hospital in June 2008.

In the rankings released for 2022-23, U.S. News & World Report ranked David Geffen School of Medicine at UCLA at No. 19 in the U.S. in research and ranked UCLA Medical Center at No. 5.

Affiliated hospitals
Notable hospitals and Medical Centers affiliated with UCLA David Geffen School of Medicine are:
 Cedars-Sinai Medical Center: The best hospital in California and the west coast, and 2nd best hospital in the United States as per U.S. News & World Report 2022-23 rankings.
 UCLA Medical Center: The 2nd best hospital in California and the west coast, and 5th best hospital in the United States as per U.S. News & World Report 2022-23 rankings.
 West LA VA Medical Center
 St. Mary Medical Center
 Kaiser Permanente- Sunset
 Kaiser Permanente- Woodland Hills

Summer programs
The David Geffen School of Medicine at UCLA accepts applications for summer academic enrichment programs. These programs include the Premedical/Predental Enrichment Program (PREP), Summer Medical Dental Education Program (SMDEP), and the Re-Application Post baccalaureate Program (RAP). Application deadlines are March 1 for the PREP and SMDEP programs, while the RAP program has a deadline of May 15.

Notable faculty

 Arie S. Belldegrun, FACS; a director of the UCLA Institute of Urologic Oncology; Professor and Chief of Urologic Oncology at the David Geffen School of Medicine; holds the Roy and Carol Doumani Chair in Urologic Oncology; Clinical Director of the UCLA Prostate Disease Research Program; Surgical Director of the UCLA Kidney Cancer Program
 Selma Calmes, co-founder of the Anesthesia History Association, former vice-chair of the department of anesthesiology
 Bruce Dobkin, director of neurological rehabilitation and editor-in-chief of the journal Neurorehabilitation and Neural Repair
 Patrick Dowling, Chairman of the Department of Family Medicine at the David Geffen School of Medicine; co-founder and co-director of the UCLA IMG Program (for International medical graduate); given the title of NHSC Ambassador by the National Health Service Corps
 David Fish, physiatrist, editor of a popular PM&R handbook, PM&R Pocketpedia
 Robert Peter Gale FACP, FRSM, expert in leukaemia therapy and bone marrow transplants; helped the Soviet Union and Japan governments mitigating the Chernobyl and Fukushima nuclear power faculty accidents
 Michael Gottlieb, one of the first physicians to report a case of AIDS
 Louis Ignarro, 1998 Nobel Prize in Physiology/Medicine
 Babak Larian, assistant clinical professor of surgery, otolaryngology
 Linda Liau, W. Eugene Stern Chair of the Department of Neurosurgery
 Sherman Mellinkoff, second dean of the UCLA School of Medicine
 Susan Perlman, Professor in the Department of Neurology
 Michael E. Phelps, one of the inventors of the positron emission tomography (PET) scanner; chairman and Norton Simon Professor of the Department of Molecular and Medical Pharmacology; director of the Crump Institute for Molecular Imaging
 Joshua Prager, president of North American Neuromodulation Society
 Alfredo Sadun, Flora L. Thornton Endowed Chair at Doheny Eye Centers-UCLA
 Alcino J. Silva, Professor of Neurobiology, Psychiatry, and Psychology; pioneer in the field of molecular and cellular cognition of memory
 Ryan Abbott, Adjunct Assistant Professor of Medicine

References

External links
 

Medical schools in California
Educational institutions established in 1951
Geffen School of Medicine
Geffen School of Medicine
1951 establishments in California
Westwood, Los Angeles
UCLA Health
David Geffen